String of Pearls is the debut studio album by the Australian rock singer-songwriter and guitarist Deborah Conway. The album was released in October 1991 and peaked at number 20 on the Australian ARIA Charts.

At the ARIA Music Awards of 1992, the album was nominated for four awards; Breakthrough Artist – Album, Album of the Year, Best Cover Art, and Best Female Artist. It won Best Female Artist.

In June 2015, Conway celebrated the 25th anniversary of the album by performing the entire album in Melbourne.

Critical reception

Jonathan Lewis from AllMusic said "String of Pearls ranges from the melodic pop of the most successful single "It's Only the Beginning" to the rock of "Under My Skin". Much of the rest of the album is acoustic pop and gentle ballads, with the superb "Release Me" being the best example. Conway's voice is what holds the album together. Her voice is strong and suited to these songs. In the hands of a lesser singer String of Pearls would not have been anywhere near as effective. Instead, Conway manages to cover the slight lack of originality in songwriting by her strong presence and produces a memorable set of songs."

Track listing

Charts

Certifications

Credits
Accordion – Dror Erez, Rick Staff
Autoharp – Michael den Elzen 
Bass – Dave Cochrane, Michael den Elzen, Nigel Griggs, Richard Pleasance
Cello – Peter O'Reilly 
Drums – Greg Morrow, Peter Jones 
Drums [Snare] – Peter Maslen
Engineer – Doug Roberts, Joe Hardy 
Guitar – Michael den Elzen, Richard Pleasance, Deborah Conway
Harmonica – Chris Wilson 
Mandolin – Richard Pleasance 
Organ – Alan Harding, Lawrence Maddy, Mick O'Connor, Rick Staff
Percussion – Greg Morrow, Michael den Elzen, Peter Maslen, Richard Pleasance
Piano – Alan Harding, Dror Erez, Richard Pleasance
Tambourine – Peter Maslen 
Trumpet – Vince Jones 
Violin – Ann Hickey, Tom Fitzgerald 
Vocals (backing) – Deborah Conway, Joe Hardy, Linda Bull, Michael den Elzen, Richard Pleasance, Vika Bull, Vince Jones

References

1991 debut albums
Deborah Conway albums
ARIA Award-winning albums
Mushroom Records albums